Somanathaswami Temple is a Hindu temple in the village of Needur in the Mayiladuthurai district of Tamil Nadu, India. The temple is dedicated to the Hindu god Shiva.

Legend
Needur is located at a distance of 5 kilometres from Mayiladuthurai. Needur is one of the many temple towns in the state which is named after the grooves, clusters or forests dominated by a particular variety of a tree or shrub and the same variety of tree or shrub sheltering the presiding deity. The region is believed to have been covered with Magila forest and hence called Magilavanam.

Significance 

The presiding deity is Somanathaswami. The consort is Veyurutholi Ammai. The temple has shrines to Sivalokanathar, Kailasanathar,  Ananda Thandavamurthy, Ganesha, Murugan  and the Seven Virgins.

According to Hindu mythology, on a visit to the earth, Indra, the king of the gods desired to do pooja for Shiva. However, he could not find a shivalinga for the purpose. He reached the banks of the Kaveri River where he collected wet mud to create a shivalinga for worship. The Somanathaswami Temple is believed to have been constructed at the spot where Indra made the shivalinga.

References 

 

Shiva temples in Mayiladuthurai district